The azure-rumped parrot (Tanygnathus sumatranus),  is a large bird endemic to Indonesia. It is found in Sulawesi and the Sangir Islands. It was previously conspecific with the blue-backed parrot, which is differentiated with its red iris and blue-back versus the azure-rumped parrot's yellow iris and plain back. It is found in forests. Flocks are small and often active at night. Its main threats are habitat loss and trapping for the pet trade.

Tax0nomy 
There are two subspecies:
 T. s. sumatranus (Raffles, 1822): Sulawesi. Sulawesi and nearby islands. Yellow iris.
 T. s. sangirensis Meyer, AB & Wiglesworth, 1894: Sangir Islands and Karakelong. More blue on wing bends and wing coverts, head darker green. Yellow iris

Previously, only sumatranus was recognized, but sangirensis was also recognized by the International Ornithological Congress in 2022 based on phylogenetic evidence.

Description 
It is of medium size (32 cm), primarily green with yellowish edging to the wings, a blue rump, and blue wing bends. The head, mantle, wings and tail are darker green, the belly and collar are lighter green. It is sexually dimorphic, with the male having a red beak and the female a pale yellow or horn colored beak.

References

 Juniper & Parr (1998) Parrots: A Guide to Parrots of the World; .

External links
 Oriental Bird Images: Azure-rumped parrot   Selected photos

Tanygnathus
Birds of Sulawesi
Birds described in 1822
Taxa named by Thomas Stamford Raffles